Inoua Bodia (born 4 December 1947) is a Cameroonian boxer. He competed in the men's lightweight event at the 1968 Summer Olympics. At the 1968 Summer Olympics, he lost to Anthony Quinn of Ireland.

References

1947 births
Living people
Cameroonian male boxers
Olympic boxers of Cameroon
Boxers at the 1968 Summer Olympics
People from Centre Region (Cameroon)
Lightweight boxers
20th-century Cameroonian people